Castello Monforte or Castle of Monforte may refer to:

 Castello Monforte, Campobasso, Italy
 Castle of Monforte, Chaves, Portugal
 Castle of Monforte, Monforte, Portugal
 Castle of Monforte, Figueira de Castelo Rodrigo, Portugal